Allan Evans (April 4, 1956 – June 6, 2020) was an American musicologist and record producer.

Biography
In 1996, Evans founded the Arbiter Recording Company, which was reformed in 2002 as a non-commercial organization Arbiter of Cultural Traditions, Inc. By 2012, he had produced over 200 recordings about forgotten artists. Evans taught at Mannes College, The New School for Music, New York, and was co-director of the Scuola Italiana del Greenwich Village. He was author of the book Ignaz Friedman: Romantic Master Pianist, and editor of the book Moriz Rosenthal in Word and Music: a Legacy of the Nineteenth Century. Evans also co-authored La Cucina Picena with his wife Beatrice Muzi.

Evans is survived by his widow and their son Stefan.

References

External links 
 Official page of Arbiter Records
 Scuola Italiana del Greenwich Village
 Mannes College, The New School for Music
 Arbiter Records at Free Music Archive
 

1956 births
2020 deaths
American record producers
American musicologists